Liu Chien-sin or Jason Liu (born 8 June 1968) is a Taiwanese politician. He was appointed as the Deputy Secretary-General to the President on 21 April 2018, and the acting Secretary-General to the President on three occasions the latest being on 2 August 2020. He served short tenures for each appointment.

Liu was appointed as the Secretary-General of the Examination Yuan on 1 September 2020.

Education
Liu obtained his bachelor's degree in business administration from National Taiwan University and master's degree from Georgetown University in the United States.

References

|-

|-

|-

1968 births
Living people
Political office-holders in the Republic of China on Taiwan
National Taiwan University alumni